The 1989–90 Lebanese Premier League season was the 30th season of the Lebanese Premier League, the top Lebanese professional league for association football clubs in the country, established in 1934.

Ansar, who were the defending champions, won their second consecutive—and overall—Lebanese Premier League title.

League table

References 

Lebanese Premier League seasons
Lebanon
1